Luis Carlos dos Santos Martins, or simply Maranhão (born June 19, 1984 in São Luís, Maranhão), is a Brazilian striker. He currently plays for North Bangkok University.

Club statistics

Honours
Ulsan Hyundai
 AFC Champions League: 2012

References

External links
Guardian's Stats Centre

1984 births
Living people
Brazilian footballers
Brazilian expatriate footballers
Expatriate footballers in Japan
Expatriate footballers in South Korea
Brazilian expatriate sportspeople in Japan
Brazilian expatriate sportspeople in South Korea
J1 League players
J2 League players
K League 1 players
K League 2 players
Ventforet Kofu players
Tokyo Verdy players
Ulsan Hyundai FC players
Jeju United FC players
Gangwon FC players
Comercial Futebol Clube (Ribeirão Preto) players
Marília Atlético Clube players
Association football forwards